Ulysses Evans (March 6, 1917 – December 1982), nicknamed "Cowboy", was an American Negro league pitcher in the 1940s.

A native of Hawkinsville, Georgia, Evans played for the Chicago American Giants in 1942. He died in Detroit, Michigan in 1982 at age 65.

References

External links
 and Seamheads

1917 births
1982 deaths
Date of death missing
Chicago American Giants players
Baseball pitchers
Baseball players from Georgia (U.S. state)
People from Hawkinsville, Georgia
20th-century African-American sportspeople